Manuel 'Manolo' Jiménez Jiménez (born 26 January 1964) is a Spanish former professional footballer who played as a left-back, currently manager of Emirati club Al Wahda.

His career was intimately connected with Sevilla as both a player and manager, and he competed solely in La Liga with the club in the former capacity. He represented Spain at the 1990 World Cup.

As a coach, Jiménez had four different spells at AEK Athens in the Super League Greece. Abroad, he also worked with Al-Rayyan and Al Wahda.

Playing career
Jiménez was born in Arahal, Province of Seville. He made his La Liga debut for Sevilla in 1983–84, and went on to make 413 competitive appearances over 14 seasons with his hometown club. He retired in June 1998 at the age of 34, after spending one year with neighbours Real Jaén in the Segunda División.

Jiménez earned 15 caps for the Spain national team. He made his international debut on 12 October 1988 in a friendly with Argentina played in Seville, and was selected for the 1990 FIFA World Cup squad, appearing against Uruguay in the group stage (0–0) and against Yugoslavia in the round of 16.

Coaching career

Sevilla
For seven seasons, Jiménez was the coach of Sevilla's reserves Sevilla Atlético, leading them to the second tier in 2006–07. On 27 October 2007, following the resignation of Juande Ramos, he was appointed manager of the main squad, initially until the end of the campaign. He guided the Andalusians to fifth place, finishing third in 2008–09 with a subsequent return to the UEFA Champions League.

Jiménez took the team to the final of the Copa del Rey in 2010, notably beating Pep Guardiola's Barcelona in the last-16 stage on the away goals rule. On 24 March 2010, however, after a 1–1 home draw to bottom-placed Xerez, he was dismissed following three draws – all at home – and two losses in the last five league matches, also having been eliminated from the Champions League in the round of 16.

AEK Athens
On 7 October 2010, Jiménez took over from the sacked Dušan Bajević at AEK Athens, agreeing to a two-year deal. Ten days later he led the team in his first game, a 4–0 Super League Greece win at Aris Thessaloniki.

After losing in the UEFA Europa League against Anderlecht (3–0, away), Jiménez achieved his second league win, against Panathinaikos. The team eventually finished 23 points behind champions Olympiacos in third place in the league.

Jiménez won his second trophy as a manager on 30 April 2011, after a 3–0 defeat of Atromitos in the final of the Greek Cup. On 5 October, he left the club by mutual consent; he had been nicknamed "Papatzis" by local newspapers in a reference to the shell game, because of his frequent tactical changes.

Zaragoza
Jiménez was appointed head coach of Real Zaragoza on 31 December 2011, replacing the fired Javier Aguirre. He was relieved of his duties at the end of the 2012–13 season, as the Aragonese were relegated to division two after four years.

Al-Rayyan
On 4 November 2013, Jiménez signed with Al-Rayyan. They were relegated from the Qatar Stars League at the end of his debut season, but achieved promotion the following year.

Jiménez's contract was terminated on 20 May 2015.

Return to AEK

Jiménez returned to AEK on 19 January 2017, succeeding José Morais who had resigned the previous day; he signed a deal until the end of the season, extendable by one year subject to satisfactory performance in domestic competitions. He oversaw the team's qualification to the group stage of a European competition on 24 August (after a six-year absence), following a 3–0 home win against Club Brugge in the Europa League play-off round.

At the end of the 2017–18 campaign, the club won the national championship for the first time in 24 years. He left the Olympic Stadium on 25 May 2018 at the end of his contract, however, after negotiations for its renewal proved unsuccessful.

Las Palmas
The same day, Jiménez agreed on a return to Spain and was appointed manager at Las Palmas, who had been relegated from the top flight the previous season. On 16 November, he was dismissed.

Later years
On 5 February 2019, Jiménez returned to AEK Athens for a third spell. In October, he switched to the UAE Pro League with Al Wahda.

Jiménez returned to AEK for the fourth time on 27 December 2020, on an 18-month deal. He was ousted at the end of the season, as they hired Vladan Milojević in his place.

In October 2022, Jiménez went back to Al Wahda.

Managerial statistics

Honours

Manager
Sevilla B
Segunda División B: 2006–07

AEK Athens
Super League Greece: 2017–18
Greek Football Cup: 2010–11

Al-Rayyan
Qatari Second Division: 2014–15

Individual
Super League Greece Manager of the Year: 2017–18

References

External links

1964 births
Living people
People from Campiña de Morón y Marchena
Sportspeople from the Province of Seville
Spanish footballers
Footballers from Andalusia
Association football defenders
La Liga players
Segunda División players
Tercera División players
Sevilla Atlético players
Sevilla FC players
Real Jaén footballers
Spain under-21 international footballers
Spain under-23 international footballers
Spain international footballers
1990 FIFA World Cup players
Spanish football managers
La Liga managers
Segunda División managers
Segunda División B managers
Sevilla Atlético managers
Sevilla FC managers
Real Zaragoza managers
UD Las Palmas managers
Super League Greece managers
AEK Athens F.C. managers
Qatar Stars League managers
Al-Rayyan SC managers
UAE Pro League managers
Al Wahda FC managers
Spanish expatriate football managers
Expatriate football managers in Greece
Expatriate football managers in Qatar
Expatriate football managers in the United Arab Emirates
Spanish expatriate sportspeople in Greece
Spanish expatriate sportspeople in Qatar
Spanish expatriate sportspeople in the United Arab Emirates